Love the Way U Lie is a 2020 Filipino comedy drama film directed by RC Delos Reyes, starring Alex Gonzaga and Xian Lim. The film was produced by Viva films and TinCan.

The film was originally slated for theatrical release on April 11, 2020, and was due to part for one of the official film entries in the inaugural Metro Manila Summer Film Festival, but the festival was cancelled due to the COVID-19 pandemic. It was then released on August 20, 2020, on Netflix.

Plot 
Nathan Torres (Xian Lim) was an online business designer who still fanatically grieved the demise of his wife Sara (Kylie Verzosa) one year prior. Stacey Likauko (Alex Gonzaga) is a psychic who told fortunes and sold Chinese knickknacks on Plaza Miranda. At the point when the two ran into each other, the soul of Sara would talk through Stacey to persuade Nathan to let her go and move on with their relationship.

Cast 

 Xian Lim as Nathan Torres
 Alex Gonzaga as Stacey Likauko
 Kylie Verzosa as Sara Torres
 Jeric Raval as Don Likauko
 Kim Molina as Janna
 Chad Kinis as Pao
 Arvic James Tan as Nix
 Gab Lagman as Marc
 Abby Bautista as Ingrid
 Sarah Pagcaliwagan as Quiapo Customer
 Marty Marcelo as Monica Lhuilley
 Toni Gonzaga as herself
 Jake Cuenca as himself

Production 
On August 21–22, 2020, the film ranked number 1 on Netflix Philippines.

References

External links 

 
 

2020 films
Philippine comedy-drama films
Filipino-language films
Films not released in theaters due to the COVID-19 pandemic
Films postponed due to the COVID-19 pandemic